Excelsior Recordings is an independent record label located in Amsterdam, Netherlands.

History
Excelsior was founded by Ferry Roseboom and Frans Hagenaars under the name "Nothing Sucks Like Electrolux", releasing a few limited-run seven inch singles in 1995. The name Excelsior was adopted in 1996 after the label was acquired by MCA Records as a subsidiary for releasing alternative rock albums in the Low Countries. By 2001, the label had acquired a distributor in the United States, Sure Fire Recordings. The label was later acquired by V2 Records.

Artists

 Absynthe Minded
 Alamo Race Track
 Alex Roeka
 Anne Soldaat
 Bauer
 Beans & Fatback
 Benjamin B
 Caesar
 Claw Boys Claw
 Daily Bread
 Daryll-Ann
 De Staat
 Do-The-Undo
 Eckhardt
 El Pino & the Volunteers
 Fixkes
 GEM
 Ghost Trucker
 Green Hornet
 Hallo Venray
 The Heights
 The Herb Spectacles
 Hospital Bombers

 Jacco Gardner
 Johan
 Lefties Soul Connection
 Liam Finn
 Lola Kite
 LPG
 Meindert Talma & the Negroes
 Moss
 Queen's Pleasure
 Roosbeef
 Scram C Baby
 Solo
 Speed 78
 Spinvis
 Supersub
 Tangarine
 The Kik
 Tim Knol
 Traumahelikopter
 Triggerfinger
 Under byen
 Veras
 zZz

References

External links
 
  (Official site)

Dutch independent record labels
Alternative rock record labels
Record labels established in 1996